The M class were the first minesweepers of the Royal Netherlands Navy. The need for minesweepers for the Dutch marine came during the First World War when sea mines were laid in great numbers.

Design and construction 
The Navy converted four tugboats into minesweepers. These ships had been built by three different shipyards; Van der Kuyk & van der Ree in Rotterdam, Fa. Koopman in Dordrecht, and J & A van der Schuyt in Papendrecht.

Service history 
All M class minesweepers were still in service during the Second World War, but none of them was able to escape to the United Kingdom; three of the four ships fell in German hands (M 3 was scuttled). After the war M 1 and M 4 were returned to the Netherlands, and re-entered service as tugboats.

Ships in class

References

Netherlandsnavy.nl :: M class minesweepers 
 Mark, C. Schepen van de Koninklijke Marine in W.O. II Alkmaar: De Alk bv, 1997: 106-116

Mine warfare vessel classes
Minesweepers of the Royal Netherlands Navy